HMS Rothesay was the lead ship of the Rothesay or Type 12M class of anti-submarine frigates of the British Royal Navy. She was commissioned in 1960 and scrapped in 1988.

Design
The Rothesay-class was an improved version of the  anti-submarine frigate, with nine Rothesays ordered in the 1954–55 shipbuilding programme for the Royal Navy to supplement the six Whitbys.

The Rothesays were powered by the same Y-100 machinery used by the Whitby class. Crew was about 212 officers and men.

A twin 4.5-inch (113 mm) Mark 6 gun mount was fitted forward, with 350 rounds of ammunition carried. It was originally intended to fit a twin 40 mm L/70 Bofors anti-aircraft mount aft, but in 1957, while Rothesay was still under construction, it was decided to fit the Seacat anti-aircraft missile instead. Seacat was not yet ready, and Rothesay was completed with a twin Mark 5 L/60 40 mm Bofors mount aft as a temporary anti-aircraft armament. The design anti-submarine armament consisted of twelve 21-inch torpedo-tubes (eight fixed and two twin rotating mounts) for Mark 20E Bidder homing anti-submarine torpedoes, backed up by two Limbo anti-submarine mortars fitted aft. The Bidder homing torpedoes proved unsuccessful however, being too slow to catch modern submarines, and the torpedo tubes were soon removed.

The ship was fitted with a Type 293Q surface/air search radar on the foremast, with a Type 277 height-finding radar on a short mast forward of the foremast. A Mark 6M fire control system (including a Type 275 radar) for the 4.5 inch guns was mounted above the ship's bridge, while a Type 974 navigation radar was also fitted. The ship's sonar fit consisted of Type 174 search, Type 170 fire control sonar for Limbo and a Type 162 sonar for classifying targets on the sea floor.

Rothesay was laid down at Yarrow's Scotstoun dockyard on 6 November 1956, was launched on 9 December 1957 by Audrey Douglas-Hamilton, wife of George Douglas-Hamilton, the First Lord of the Admiralty, and completed on 23 April 1960.

Modernisation
A hangar and flight deck was added aft to allow a Westland Wasp helicopter to be operated, at the expense of one of the Limbo anti-submarine mortars, while a Seacat launcher and the associated GWS20 director was mounted on the hangar roof. Two 20-mm cannons were added either side of the ship's bridge. A MRS3 fire control system replaced the Mark 6M, and its integral Type 903 radar allowed the Type 277 height finder radar to be removed. A Type 993 surface/air-search radar replaced the existing Type 293Q radar, while the ship's defences were enhanced by the addition of the Corvus chaff rocket dispenser.

History
In the spring/summer of 1961 Rothesay was in Halifax, Nova Scotia and was intending to make courtesy calls at ports on the eastern seaboard of the United States but was instead diverted to Bermuda, location of the Royal Naval Dockyard that had been reduced to a naval station in 1951 (and headquarters of the America and West Indies Station until 1956, when the position of the Commander-in-Chief was abolished, though the station frigates remained based there), where she was to stay ready to protect British interests in Cuba. On 21 March 1962 she accidentally rammed the Turkish   in the western Mediterranean (off Gibraltar) during the NATO exercise "Dawn Breeze". Between 1962 and 1963 she was commanded by Captain B C Godfrey Place.

During two visits to the West Indies (7 months and 11 months) she was at Nassau, Bahamas and filmed for three days to get a 30-second showing in the James Bond film Thunderball. A sheet of canvas with a "0" was placed over the "F1" of her pennant number (F107) to read 007. Sean Connery and Claudine Auger came on board.

Between 1966 and 1968 Rothesay was refitted in Rosyth. Among the improvements the 40 mm gun was replaced with Seacat missile system, radar and communication equipment was updated, accommodation improved and perhaps most significantly a helicopter flight deck and hangar were added. Although this required the removal of one of the two triple barrelled anti-submarine mortars, it allowed the Rothesay class to carry the Westland Wasp helicopter which was a huge asset for anti-submarine operations. This modernisation was a vast improvement over the Whitby class and brought the Rothesay class up to the standard of the succeeding .

In 1971 she was present at Portsmouth Navy Days.

In April 1970 Rothesay was one of several Royal Navy vessels that were stationed for a possible tertiary splashdown recovery of Apollo 13 in a position just south of Rio de Janeiro, Brazil.

In 1973 Rothesay undertook Cod War fishery protection patrols.

At this time she was part of the 8th Frigate Squadron.

At the start of the Falklands War, Rothesay was in Rosyth under repair after she hit a sea wall in Esbjerg, Denmark. During the 1982 conflict, Rothesay was stationed in the Caribbean.

There were plans to withdraw the ship from service in 1983 but these were abandoned and instead in 1985 she underwent a refit in preparation for her new role in the Dartmouth Training Squadron. She served in this role until she was paid off on 13 March 1988. During her many years of service she clocked up over 800,000 miles. She was sold to Spain and was broken up at Santander in 1988.

Notes

References

Publications
 
 
 
 
 
 

 

Rothesay-class frigates
1957 ships
Maritime incidents in 1962
Rothesay, Bute